Caralluma edulis is a succulent species in the plant family Apocynaceae, native to India and Pakistan.

The leaves and stem are eaten in North Africa.

References

External links
PROTAbase on Caralluma edulis

Asclepiadoideae
Flora of the Indian subcontinent
Plants described in 1862
Edible plants